The shipwreck of Mahdia was found by Greek sponge fishermen off the coast of Tunisia in June 1907. The shipwreck near the modern town of Mahdia is dated about the 80s BC, or even later.

In a series of underwater campaigns numerous items were recovered and placed on display at the Musée National du Bardo, Tunis. The greater part of the sculptures were salvaged between 1907 and 1913 by French archaeologist Alfred Merlin, at that time Director of Antiquities in the Protectorate of Tunisia. Further, survey work on the site was done by a team led by Mensun Bound, but unfortunately no further excavations have been possible.

Cargo
The ship was presumably driven by a storm onto the north African coast en route from Piraeus, the port of Athens, to Italy, as it was carrying Greek works of art intended for Roman purchasers, marble and bronze sculptures, high-quality furniture fittings, decorative items and architectural elements. These were later restored by researchers from the Rheinisches Landesmuseum Bonn in Germany. There were also several dozen heavy marble columns and parts of catapults.

It has been generally thought that the marble columns were removed and shipped by order of Lucius Cornelius Sulla after his sacking of Athens in 86 BC. None of the epic-scaled Homeric figures that gained popularity in the 1st century BC were to be found, nor any copies of Classical works of the 5th century, as Nikolaus Himmelmann pointed out, contrasting the Mahdia cargo with the similar cargo of the somewhat later Antikythera ship. Recovered were a marble bust probably of Ariadne, two large-scale bronzes, a herm figure of a turbaned Dionysus, inscribed with the name of its maker, Boëthos of Chalcedon, and a lithe, winged olive-wreathed boy, identified by scholars as Agon or Eros Enagonios, Eros as lord of contests, a bronze bust of Ariadne, and two bronze statuettes of dancing dwarfs.

Among five smaller bronzes, found at the site in 1910, was the satyr illustrated at right. The site also contained lead objects, including anchors, tubes and plates, and ingots that, according to their isotope-composition, seem to come from the Sierra de Cartagena in Spain.

See also
List of shipwrecks

References

Further reading
 Fuchs, Werner, Der Schiffsfund von Mahdia (Tübingen, 1963)
 Hellenkemper-Salies G., Prittwitz Η.-Η., Gaffron und Gerhard Bauchheuß (eds.) 1994. Das Wrack. Der antike Schiffsfund von Mahdia, Katalog des Rheinischen Landesmuseums Bonn, 2 Bd. (Köln, 1994). 
 Merlin Α., 1908, Bulletin de la société nationale des antiquaires de France 1908, 128-131.

External links
 http://www.deguwa.org/?id=40

1907 in Tunisia
Ancient shipwrecks
Shipwrecks in the Mediterranean Sea
Archaeology of shipwrecks
shipwreck